Juan Diez de Betanzos (b. Betanzos, Spain 1510 – d. Cusco, Peru March 1, 1576) wrote one of the most important sources  on the conquest of the Incan civilization, Narrative of the Incas. He based this account of the Incas on the testimony of his wife Cuxirimay Ocllo (Doña Angelina), who had been previously married to Incan King Atahualpa as well as conducting interviews of Incans who had taken part in the Battle of Cajamarca or been in Atahualpa's camp.

The Narrative of the Incas is rare in coming from the Indian perspective. In the absence of written Incan sources, it is also relatively unique in providing us with an insight into Incan civilization before the conquest with early expansion, the development of the kingdom of Cuzco by Yupanqui, and the great imperial policies of Huayna Capac. It also provides an insight into the civil war between Huáscar and Atahualpa that ravaged the Incan civilization immediately prior to the arrival of Francisco Pizarro. However, coming from Atahualpa's wife's point of view, the source is biased against Huáscar.

References

External links
 

Incan scholars
Interpreters
1510 births
1576 deaths